The Sanchez-March House, near Los Ojos, New Mexico, was built around 1880.  It was listed on the National Register of Historic Places in 1985.

The listing includes the house and two log barns, with a total of three contributing buildings.

It was deemed to be the best preserved of several "officer's plan" houses in the area, which by oral tradition were based on a type of officer's house used at Fort Lowell.  The type introduced Anglo-American elements into the local architecture.  It includes stock Queen Anne elements.

It is built with stucco and end boards over  adobe walls and has a wraparound porch.

References

External links

		
National Register of Historic Places in Rio Arriba County, New Mexico
Houses completed in 1880
1880 establishments in New Mexico Territory